Route 86 is a highway in southwest Missouri.
The eastern terminus is at U.S. Route 65 just north of Ridgedale.  From there, the road crosses the Long Creek arm of Table Rock Lake and continues to Blue Eye west between the Arkansas state line on the south and Table Rock Lake on the north.  This section is also in the Mark Twain National Forest, and is recommended as a scenic drive by the Missouri Department of Transportation.  From Eagle Rock the road turns north to join with Route 76 at Bates Corner with which it is runs concurrent through Cassville to just east of Rocky Comfort.  The road continues north and west towards Neosho, then goes further west before turning north towards Joplin where the road ends at the interchange of Interstate 44 and Route 43.  Except for a short section in Neosho (where it overlaps with Business I-49), the road is a two-lane highway for its entire length.

History
The original highway only ran between Ridgedale and Route 43 (now Route 13) north of Blue Eye.  It was later extended both east and west.  The eastern terminus moving to Kissee Mills, with the route joined with U.S. Route 65 to modern-day Route 76 where it turned east and followed this road to Kissee Mills.  It would later be truncated back to its later eastern terminus.

Major intersections

References

086
Transportation in Newton County, Missouri
Transportation in Barry County, Missouri
Transportation in Stone County, Missouri
Transportation in Taney County, Missouri